Drenkovo is a sparsely populated and dispersed village in Blagoevgrad Municipality, in Blagoevgrad Province, Bulgaria. It is situated in the foothills of Vlahina mountain few kilometers west of Blagoevgrad and north from the road to North Macedonia. There are ruins of Roman villa near the village.

References

Villages in Blagoevgrad Province